Pacific Command may refer to:

 Pacific Command (Canadian Army), a formation of the Canadian Army created during the Second World War
 United States Indo-Pacific Command (previously United States Pacific Command), a unified combatant command of the United States Armed Forces